In 1977 election to Uttar Pradesh Legislative Assembly Janata Party won 352 out of total 425 seats. The leader of the Uttar Pradesh Janata legislative party was chosen through election. Ram Naresh Yadav secured 277 votes and became the leader. He was sworn in as Chief Minister of Uttar Pradesh on 23 June 1977. Here are the names of ministers in his ministry:

Cabinet ministers

Ram Naresh Yadav- Chief minister
Ram Prakash Gupta
 Satya Prakash Malaviya
Ravindra Kishore Sahi
Balbir Singh
Rajendra Singh - Minister of Agriculture
Ram Singh - Minister of Home
Kali Charan Yadav  - Minister of Education
Keshari Nath Tripathi
Sharada Bhakta Singh
 Mohammad Masood Khan
Kalyan Singh
Shree Chand
Harish Chandra Srivastva
Ganesh Dutt Bajpai Minister of Local Self-government
Madhukar Dighe - Minister of Finance 
Yamuna Prasad Bose - Minister of Rural Development and Panchayati Raj
Abid Ali Ansari
Mulayam Singh Yadav
Smt Chandra Vati Devi
Om Prakash

Ministers of State

Laxman Singh
Avadhesh Singh
Dhirendra Sahai
Subedar Prasad
Shakuntala Nayar
Rewati Raman Singh
Muhammad Muhiuddin - Jail and Forest

Deputy ministers

Bhagavati Singh
 Babu Lal Verma - Minister of State for Rural Development
Shiv Das Tiwari
 Malti Sharma - Minister of State for Education
Chotelal Yadav -Minister of State for irrigation and village development
Maq-bool H Khan
Mukhtar Anis
Tej Singh

References

1977 in Indian politics
Uttar Pradesh ministries
Janata Party state ministries
1977 establishments in Uttar Pradesh
Cabinets established in 1977
1979 disestablishments in India
Cabinets disestablished in 1979